In archaeology, instrumentum domesticum (or simply instrumentum) refers to instruments, tools, and other artifacts intended for ordinary and domestic use (as opposed, for instance, to objects with religious, ceremonial, or monumental purposes).  It also includes replicas of such objects made to be deposited in graves.  The name is Latin for "domestic instruments", a term originally defined by Roman Law. 

In epigraphy and paleography, the term refers to inscriptions that were written on such objects at or near the time of their use.  In this sense, it also includes inscriptions in oracular objects (like the sortes of the Romans), talismans, and personal spells (like the Roman and Greek curse tablets).  It does not however include objects whose function was to carry text, such as writing tablets and books.

Gallery

References

Archaeology